Antonio Montauti (1685 - 1740) was an 18th-century Italian sculptor active in Florence and Rome.

Biography
He was a pupil of Giuseppe Piamontini. His patron, Cardinal Francesco Maria de' Medici, obtained the first known works circa 1708–9. They were destined for his first patron. In 1733 he was recruited to Rome by Cardinal Alamanno Salviati and soon won the favor with Pope Clement XII, who in 1735 appointed him as surveyor for the Vatican. He completed both statuary, busts, as well as smaller bronzes and medals.

About 1715 he carved two reliefs of St Philip Neri, depicting the Ecstasy of Philip and the Distribution of Bread for the church of San Firenze in Florence. In 1721 a now lost Ganymede and four other marbles he was carving for John Molesworth were described as his "first works". In 1726 he made large marble statue of Saint Maria Maddalena de' Pazzi for the cloister of San Frediano in Cestello.

References 

1685 births
1740 deaths
18th-century Italian sculptors
Italian male sculptors
18th-century Italian male artists